Ganesha Persaud (14 January 1925 – 19 March 1981) was a Guyanese cricketer. He played in nine first-class matches for British Guiana from 1947 to 1953.

See also
 List of Guyanese representative cricketers

References

External links
 

1925 births
1981 deaths
Guyanese cricketers
Guyana cricketers